The Consortium for Research on Renewable Industrial Materials (CORRIM) is a non-profit organization dedicated to developing life-cycle assessment (LCA) data related to wood-based materials and energy, and their alternatives.

Research results

In general, the data generated through CORRIM research provide evidence for the favorable environmental impact profile of wood products. Complete CORRIM reports are available from its website, and have been published by the Society of Wood Science and Technology (SWST) in its journal. The life cycle inventory (LCI) data developed by CORRIM are also available to the public from the US LCI Database Project.

References

External links 
 
 Phase 1 report
 Phase 2 report
 US LCI Database
 The Society of Wood Science and Technology
 The Athena Institute

Non-profit organizations based in Seattle
Renewable resources